Tetsuhiro is a masculine Japanese given name.

Possible writings
Tetsuhiro can be written using different combinations of kanji characters. Some examples:

鉄弘, "iron, vast"
鉄広, "iron, wide"
鉄廣, "iron, wide"
鉄寛, "iron, generosity"
鉄博, "iron, doctor"
鉄大, "iron, big"
鉄裕, "iron, abundant"
鉄洋, "iron, ocean"
鉄宏, "iron, wide"
鉄尋, "iron, look for"
哲弘, "philosophy, vast"
哲広, "philosophy, wide"
哲廣, "philosophy, wide"
哲寛, "philosophy, generosity"
哲大, "philosophy, big"
哲裕, "philosophy, abundant"
哲洋, "philosophy, ocean"
哲紘, "philosophy, vast"
哲宏, "philosophy, wide"
哲尋, "philosophy, look for"
徹弘, "penetrate, vast"

The name can also be written in hiragana てつひろ or katakana テツヒロ.

Notable people with the name
, Japanese folk singer
, Japanese neuropsychiatrist
, Japanese footballer
, Japanese professional wrestler
, Japanese artist

Japanese masculine given names